Bispøyan is a group of islands in the municipality of Hitra in Trøndelag county, Norway.  They are located north of the village of Kvenvær on the island of Hitra, and northwest of the island of Helgbustadøya.  The largest islands include Burøya, Olderøya, Monsøya, and Henriksøya.  The rocky islands are now all uninhabited, but the many homes on them are used as summer vacation homes.

See also
List of islands of Norway

References

Islands of Trøndelag
Hitra